Brian Lester Davis (born 2 August 1974) is an English professional golfer.

Davis was born in London. He turned professional in 1994 and became a member of the European Tour in 1997. He performed steadily for his first six seasons on the Tour, and won the 2000 Peugeot Open de España. In 2003, despite not winning a tournament, he had his best season by far to that time, finishing ninth on the European Tour Order of Merit. The highlights of his season included finishing in a tie for sixth at The Open Championship, and placing third in the European Tour's tour championship, the Volvo Masters, as well as two second places in lower profile events and playing on the winning Great Britain and Ireland team in the Seve Trophy. His second European Tour win came in 2004 at the ANZ Championship and later that year he became the first Englishman to be medalist at the PGA Tour Qualifying Tournament. In 2005 he played on both the U.S.-based PGA Tour and the European Tour and in 2006 he concentrated more on the PGA Tour, making only a handful of appearances in Europe. Davis had two solid seasons on the PGA Tour in 2007 and 2008 where he finished inside the top 100 on the money list both times, including a runner-up at the Legends Reno-Tahoe Open.

2009 was a very consistent season for Davis. The season included 5th-place finishes at The Players Championship and the Valero Texas Open, followed by a third straight top 5 finish at the HP Byron Nelson Championship where he matched his best finish on the PGA Tour when he was runner-up behind Rory Sabbatini. He finished the season 43rd on the money list.

In April 2010 Davis called a two-stroke penalty on himself on the first play-off hole on Sunday to hand Jim Furyk a victory at the Verizon Heritage. Davis later received much praise for his decision which cost him a potential first PGA Tour victory. Davis finished second again later in 2010 at the Crowne Plaza Invitational at Colonial, three shots behind Zach Johnson.

Davis has featured in the top 50 of the Official World Golf Rankings.

Amateur wins (1)
1992 Peter McEvoy Trophy

Professional wins (2)

European Tour wins (2)

1Co-sanctioned by the PGA Tour of Australasia

European Tour playoff record (0–1)

Playoff record
PGA Tour playoff record (0–1)

Results in major championships

CUT = missed the half-way cut
"T" = tied

Summary

Most consecutive cuts made – 2 (2003 U.S. Open – 2003 Open Championship)
Longest streak of top-10s – 1

Results in The Players Championship

CUT = missed the halfway cut
"T" indicates a tie for a place

Results in World Golf Championships

QF, R16, R32, R64 = Round in which player lost in match play
"T" = Tied

Team appearances
Amateur
Jacques Léglise Trophy (representing Great Britain & Ireland): 1992 (winners)

Professional
Alfred Dunhill Cup (representing England): 2000
World Cup (representing England): 2000
Seve Trophy (representing Great Britain & Ireland): 2003 (winners)

See also
2004 PGA Tour Qualifying School graduates
2015 Web.com Tour Finals graduates

References

External links

English male golfers
European Tour golfers
PGA Tour golfers
Korn Ferry Tour graduates
Golfers from London
Golfers from Orlando, Florida
1974 births
Living people